
Gmina Dąbrówka is a rural gmina (administrative district) in Wołomin County, Masovian Voivodeship, in east-central Poland. Its seat is the village of Dąbrówka.

Villages
Gmina Dąbrówka contains the villages and settlements of Chajęty, Chruściele, Cisie, Czarnów, Dąbrówka, Dręszew, Działy Czarnowskie, Guzowatka, Józefów, Karolew, Karpin, Kołaków, Kowalicha, Kuligów, Lasków, Ludwinów, Małopole, Marianów, Ostrówek, Ślężany, Sokołówek, Stanisławów, Stasiopole, Teodorów, Trojany, Wszebory and Zaścienie.

Neighbouring gminas
Gmina Dąbrówka is bordered by the gminas of Klembów, Radzymin, Somianka, Tłuszcz, Wyszków and Zabrodzie.

References

Polish official population figures 2006

Dabrowka
Wołomin County